Stefan G. Hofmann (born 1964) is a German-born clinical psychologist. He is the Alexander von Humboldt Professor and recipient of the LOEWE Spitzenprofessur for Translational Clinical Psychology at the Philipps University of Marburg in Germany and Professor for Psychology at the Department of Psychological and Brain Sciences at Boston University examining Cognitive Behavioral Therapy, especially for anxiety disorders Since 2012, he has been editor in chief of the journal Cognitive Therapy and Research

Education 

Hofmann was born on December 15, 1964 in Bietigheim-Bissingen. He attended Ellental Gymnasien and studied clinical psychology at the University of Marburg where he received a terminal degree (Dipl.-Psych.) in 1990, as well as a doctorate (Dr. rer. nat) in 1993 under the mentorship of Anke Ehlers. After a doctoral fellowship funded by the German Academic Exchange Service at Stanford University and post-doctoral work with David H. Barlow, he joined Boston University as a faculty member in 1996.

Scientific contributions

Clinical Translational Research 

Hofmann has been studying the nature of emotional disorders and the processes through which psychological treatments alleviate symptoms by translating discoveries from emotion research and neuroscience into clinical applications.

Pharmacological Augmentation of Psychotherapy 

An important mechanism of exposure therapy for anxiety disorders is extinction learning. Hofmann has shown that d-cycloserine, a partial agonist of the glutamate receptor can augment extinction learning and speed up exposure therapy of anxiety disorders.

Emotion Research 

Some of his other major contributions are on Mindfulness and research on Emotion in therapy. In particular, he advanced the concept of Interpersonal emotion regulation.

Processes-Based Therapy 

In collaboration with Steven C. Hayes and David Sloan Wilson, he has been developing Process-based Therapy (PBT), an idiographic  treatment approach based on Cognitive Behavioral Therapy that combines insights from evolution theory and complex network theory to target processes that underlie effective psychological treatments.

Neuromarkers of Psychotherapy 

He has been using Magnetic Resonance Imaging to predict the response to cognitive behavioral therapy (CBT).

Awards and recognition 

Hofmann has published more than 400 peer-reviewed scientific articles and 20 books and is listed by Clarivate Analytics and the Institute for Scientific Information as a ISI Highly Cited Researcher. He was awarded a 2021 Alexander von Humboldt Professorship. Hofmann was president of the Association for Behavioral and Cognitive Therapies from 2012-2013. He was the recipient of the 2018 Humboldt Prize and the 2015 Aaron T. Beck award for significant and enduring contributions to the field of cognitive therapy. Hofmann became a member of the Academia Europaea in 2018 and was elected to the rank of AAAS Fellow in 2020 "for distinguished contributions to the study and practice of cognitive behavioral therapy, especially for anxiety disorders." He is also a Fellow of the American Psychological Society, and the Association for Behavioral and Cognitive Therapies.

Selected works

Books 
 
Hofmann, S. G. (2011). An introduction to modern CBT: Psychological solutions to mental health problems. Chichester, UK: Wiley-Blackwell. .

Hofmann, S. G. (2016). Emotion in therapy: From science to practice. New York, NY: Guilford Press. .

Barlow, D. H., Durand, V. M., & Hofmann, S. G. (2017). Abnormal psychology: An Integrative approach (8th edition).  Brooks/Cole Cengage Learning. .

Hayes, S. C. & Hofmann, S. G. (Eds.) (2018). "Process-based CBT: The science and core clinical competencies of cognitive behavioral therapy". Oakland, CA: New Harbinger Publications. .

Hofmann, S. G. Doan, S. N. (2018). "The social foundations of emotion: Developmental, cultural, and clinical dimensions". Washington, DC: American Psychological Association. .

Hayes, S. C. & Hofmann, S. G. (Eds.) (2020). Beyond the DSM: Toward a process-based alternative for diagnosis and mental health treatment. Oakland, CA: Context Press / New Harbinger Publications. .

Hofmann, S. G. (2020). The anxiety skills workbook: Simple CBT and mindfulness strategies for overcoming anxiety, fear, and worry.  Oakland, CA: New Harbinger Press. .

Hofmann, S. G., Hayes, S. C., & Lorscheid, D. (2021). Learning process-based therapy: A skills training manual for targeting the core processes of psychological change in clinical practice. Oakland, CA: New Harbinger Press. .

Articles 

Hofmann, S. G., Sawyer, A. T., Witt, A., & Oh, D. (2010). The effect of mindfulness-based therapy on anxiety and depression: A meta-analytic review. Journal of Consulting and Clinical Psychology, 78, 169-183. 

Hofmann, S. G., Asnaani, A., Vonk, J. J., Sawyer, A. T., & Fang, A. (2012). The efficacy of cognitive behavioral therapy: A review of meta-analyses. Cognitive Therapy and Research, 36, 427-440. 

Hofmann, S. G., Sawyer, A. T., Fang, A., & Asnaani, A. (2012). Emotion dysregulation model of mood and anxiety disorders. Depression and Anxiety, 29, 409-416. .

Brain connectomics predict response to treatment in social anxiety disorder. Molecular Psychiatry, 21, 680-685. 

Hofmann, S. G. (2016). Schrödinger's cat and d-cycloserine to augment exposure therapy – both are dead and alive. JAMA Psychiatry, 73, 771-772. .

Hayes, S. C. & Hofmann, S. G. (2017). The third wave of CBT and the rise of process-based care. World Psychiatry, 16, 245-246. 

Hayes, S. C. & Hofmann, S. G. (2021). "Third-wave" cognitive and behavioral therapies and the emergence of a process-based approach to intervention in psychiatry. World Psychiatry, 20, 363-375. 

Hofmann, S. G. & Hayes, S. C. (2019). The future of intervention science: Process-based therapy. Clinical Psychological Science, 7, 37–50. .

Hofmann, S. G. (2020). The age of depression and its treatment. JAMA Psychiatry, 77, 667-668. .

Phelps, E. A. & Hofmann, S. G. (2019). Memory editing from science fiction to clinical practice. Nature, 572, 43-50.

References

1964 births
Living people
20th-century psychologists
21st-century psychologists
German psychologists